Abdul Ela Al Quraishi (born 2 December 1997) is an Indian cricketer. He made his Twenty20 debut for Hyderabad in the 2021–22 Syed Mushtaq Ali Trophy on 8 November 2021.

References

External links
 

1997 births
Living people
Indian cricketers
Hyderabad cricketers
Place of birth missing (living people)